Splint or splints may refer to:

 Splint (laboratory equipment), a small wooden tinderstick used in laboratories
 Splint (medicine), a device immobilizing part of the body
 Splint (programming tool), for analyzing software
 Splint basketry
 Splints, a horse ailment
 Shin splints, a condition that mainly affects athletes
 Mandibular advancement splint, a medical device worn in the mouth used to treat sleep-related breathing disorders

See also
 
 
 Splinter (disambiguation)